"Primal Scream" is a song by the American heavy metal band Mötley Crüe. The single was released on the 1991 album Decade of Decadence 81-91, which was the band's first of many greatest hits compilations. The song charted at No. 63 on Billboard Hot 100 and No. 21 on the Mainstream rock charts. Decade of Decadence was released on October 19, 1991, and "Primal Scream" was one of three newly recorded songs for the album, the other two being "Angela" and "Anarchy in the U.K.".

Background
The uncensored version of a "Primal Scream" music video contained full-frontal nudity of a female dancing at the end, but that scene was edited for heavy rotation when shown on television.

The song was said by Nikki Sixx himself in an AskSixx session on Twitter in October 2015, to be about Arthur Janov's 1970 book The Primal Scream. Primal Therapy: A Cure For Neurosis, as well as his own childhood.

Decade of Decadence also included another single, the remix version of "Home Sweet Home" which was the band's eighth and final Top 40 hit in 1991, reaching No. 37 on the Billboard Hot 100. The original 1985 version only reached No. 89 on the same chart.

Personnel
 Vince Neil – vocals
 Mick Mars – guitar
 Nikki Sixx – bass guitar
 Tommy Lee – drums

Charts

References

Mötley Crüe songs
1991 singles
Songs written by Nikki Sixx
1991 songs
Elektra Records singles
Song recordings produced by Bob Rock